Good Guys is the second studio album by American country music singer Bucky Covington. It was released on September 11, 2012. via E1 Music. The album includes the singles "I Want My Life Back", "Gotta Be Somebody" (a Nickelback cover), and "A Father's Love (The Only Way He Knew How)", all of which Covington released for the defunct Lyric Street Records between 2009 and 2010. "I Wanna Be That Feeling" was promoted as the album's official lead single by E1 Music, and "Drinking Side of Country" was released as the follow-up.

Critical reception
Giving it 4 out of 5 stars, Tammy Ragusa of Country Weekly said that Covington "sounds so at ease on every track". Stephen Thomas Erlewine of Allmusic rated it 2.5 stars out of 5, criticizing it for having "numerous awkward country-pop attempts". Matt Bjorke of Roughstock gave it 3 out of 5, saying that "He's an emotive, effervescent vocalist with a winning personality and that personality and emotion is shown in abundance throughout the album."

Track listing

Personnel
 Bucky Covington – lead vocals
 Dan Dugmore – steel guitar, lap steel guitar
 Shayne Hill – electric guitar
 Gregg "Hobie" Hubbard – background vocals
 Bobby Huff – drums, percussion, background vocals
 Shooter Jennings – duet vocals on "Drinking Side of Country"
 Mac McAnally – acoustic guitar, piano
 Blair Masters – keyboards
 Dale Oliver – dobro, acoustic guitar, electric guitar, programming, slide guitar
 Jason Roller – fiddle, acoustic guitar, mandolin
 Jim Scholten – bass guitar

Chart performance

Album

Singles

References

2012 albums
Bucky Covington albums
E1 Music albums